Arif Iqbal Hussain Bhatti (death 17 October 1997) was a Pakistani jurist who was Judge of the Lahore High Court and was murdered for alleged blasphemy in verdict.

In 1995, he along Justice Khurshid Ahmed acquitted two Christian men of blasphemy charges.

In 1997, he was murdered by the Barelvi mobster Ahmed Sher for alleged blasphemy by acquitting blasphemy offenders.

See also
 Salman Taseer

References

1997 deaths
Pakistani judges
Judges of the Lahore High Court
Assassinated Pakistani people
Blasphemy law in Pakistan